Casa da Mãe Joana is a 2008 Brazilian comedy film directed by Hugo Carvana. The film was released in Brazil on September 19, 2008.

Its sequel, Casa da Mãe Joana 2, was released on September 6, 2013.

Cast 
 José Wilker as Juca
 Paulo Betti as PR
 Antônio Pedro Borges as Montanha
 Laura Cardoso as Herly
 Fernanda de Freitas as Tainacã
 Pedro Cardoso as Vavá
 Malu Mader as Laura
 Juliana Paes as Dolores Sol
 Agildo Ribeiro as Comendador/Lola Brandão
 Luís Carlos Miele as Camões
 Claudio Marzo as Leopoldo
 Arlete Salles as Cliente
 Beth Goulart as Cliente
 Cláudia Borioni as Madame
 Maria Gladys as Bêbada no ateliê
 Lu Grimaldi as Cliente
 Roberto Maya as Oficial de Justiça
 Hugo Carvana as Salomão

References

External links
 
 

Brazilian comedy films
2008 comedy films
2008 films
2000s Portuguese-language films